The Rural Municipality of Birch Hills No. 460 is a rural municipality (RM) in the Canadian province of Saskatchewan within Census Division No. 15 and  Division No. 5. It is located in the north-central portion of the province on Highway 3 southeast of Prince Albert and north of Saskatoon.

History 
The RM of Birch Hills No. 460 incorporated as a rural municipality on December 11, 1911. The RM's name comes from all of the hills to the south and east and the abundance of birch trees which once covered the area.

Geography 
The RM is part of the aspen parkland biome.

Communities and localities 
The following urban municipalities are surrounded by the RM.

Towns
 Birch Hills

The following unincorporated communities are within the RM.

Organized hamlets
Brancepeth
Hagen

The Muskoday First Nation Indian reserve lies adjacent to the RM.

Demographics 

Education 
The RM is within the Saskatchewan Rivers School Division No. 119.

Government 
The RM of Birch Hills No. 460 is governed by an elected municipal council and an appointed administrator that meets on the second Wednesday of every month. The reeve of the RM is Alan Evans while its administrator is Cherie Opseth. The RM's office is located in Birch Hills.

References 

B

Division No. 15, Saskatchewan